Walter Keeler may refer to:

 Walter Keeler (settler), founding settler of Norwalk, Connecticut
 Walter Keeler (studio potter), British studio potter